Alphagene ("Alpha genes") is the debut studio album by German rapper Kollegah, released on 16 November 2007 through Selfmade Records.

History 
After the release of his mixtape Boss der Bosse, Kollegah started to work on his debut album which had taken him nine months to finish. For six months he worked on his records so intensively that he had no contact to his family and friends during that time.

Track listing
"Intro" – 2:31
Produced by: Rizbo
"Veni, Vidi, Vici" – 2:25
Produced by: Six June
"Alphagene" – 3:23
Produced by: JAW
"Showtime III" – 4:34
Produced by: Rizbo
"24/7" 3:55
Featuring: Sahin
Produced by: JAW
"Kuck auf die Goldkette 2007" – 3:51
Produced by: Rizbo
"Endlevel" – 4:34
Featuring: DeineLtan
Produced by: Rizbo
"Dealer" (Prelude) – 0:59
Produced by: JAW
"Vom Dealer zum Star" – 3:51
"Star" (Afterlude) – 2:29
Produced by: Vizir
"Der Boss hängt voll Gold" – 4:06
"Sie hassen uns" – 3:52
Featuring: Toony
"Alles was ich hab" – 3:47
Produced by: Rizbo
"Selfmade Endbosse" – 4:28
Featuring: Favorite
Produced by: Nace & Shalla
"Machomannstyle" – 3:57
Featuring: Bass Sultan Hengzt
Produced by: JAW
"Legenden" - 3:41
Featuring: K.I.Z
Produced by: Rizbo
"Der Einzelkämpfer" – 3:13
Produced by: Vizir
"Ein Junge weint hier nicht" – 4:25
Featuring: Slick One & Tarek of K.I.Z
Produced by: Rizbo
"Pokerfacekönig" – 4:15
Produced by: Jimmy Ledrac
"Outro" – 3:46
Produced by: JAW

Reference list

External links
Alphagene-Blog (in German)

2007 albums
Kollegah albums
German-language albums